Alexander Stewart (1794 - 1847) was born at the manse in Moulin,  Perthshire, on  25  September  1794. He was the son of  Alexander Stewart,  minister  of  Canongate,  Edinburgh. He was  educated  at  King's College,  Aberdeen,  and the University of Glasgow. He was  ordained  to the Chapel-of-Ease,  Rothesay,  on 10  February  1824 and later  translated, and admitted to Cromarty on  23  September  1824.  He joined  the  Free Church  in  1843. He continued as the  minister  of the Free  Church, Cromarty, from 1843 to 1847. He was elected  to  Free St George's,  Edinburgh  (as  successor  to  Dr Candlish),  but  died  before the induction, on 5 November  1847,  of  a  fever.  He was  reckoned  one  of  the  most  eminent preachers  in the Church. Hugh Miller wrote  warmly  of  him.

Early life and education

Alexander Stewart was the son of Alexander Stewart, Church of Scotland minister at Moulin,  Perthshire and he was born at the manse in Moulin, on  25  September  1794. He was educated  in  the Moulin  Parish  School,  and  thereafter  at  the  Tain  Academy.  Subsequently, he  became  a  student  of  King's  College,  Old  Aberdeen,  where  he  continued for  two  sessions.  Then,  being  considered  sufficiently  educated  for  entering on  the  business  of  life  in  the  line  chosen  for  him,  he  first  became  a clerk  in  a  house  at  Perth,  and  thereafter  in  a  house  in  London. While in London,  he  attended  the  ministry  of  Mr George Clayton, under whose ministry he is reported to have been influenced. Stewart decided to study for the ministry of the church while in London.

In  the Divinity  Hall,  as  a  student  with  Dr M'Gill,  he  was  more  especially noticed.

From  the  date  of  his  first  appearance  in  the  pulpit,  he  became eminent  as  a  preacher. The  attention  of  the  first  ministers  of  his  time was  attracted  to  him.

Church of Scotland ministry

He was licensed to preach by Presbytery of Lorn  in  1822. In November  1823  he  was  chosen  to  be  the  minister  of  the  Chapel  of  Ease, Rothesay,  where  the  Sabbath  services  were  half  in  Gaelic  and  half  in  English. He was subsequently  ordained  to the Chapel-of-Ease,  Rothesay,  on 10  February  1824. He was presented  by  George  IV.  in  June,  translated,  and admitted to Cromarty on  23  September  1824. Hugh Miller was one of his parishioners there.

Cromarty Free Church ministry
Mr  Stewart  continued  minister  of  Cromarty  till  his  death.  At  the Disruption  he  abandoned  his  connection with  the  State,  abjuring  the  new  ecclesiastical  Establishment. He  never  made  himself  prominent  in  the  discussions  which,  in  his  time  filled  the  land.  Beith reports that his  local  influence  was  great.  Speeches  by  him  in  his Presbytery  and  Synod  were  described, says Beith, by  those  who  heard  them  as  something unlike  any  that  other  men  had  ever  spoken.  But  on  no  occasion during  his  ministry  did  he  open  his  mouth  in  the  General  Assembly  of  the Church.  He  did  not  feel  it  to  be  required.  He  did  not  think  it  would have  been  useful.

Call to Edinburgh and death
On the death of Thomas Chalmers, Robert Smith Candlish was appointed to replace him at New College. This left his congregation of St George's, Edinburgh without a full time minister. The congregation was summoned for 22 September, and with equal unanimity agreed to call Mr. Stewart to be their pastor. From the first Mr. Stewart regarded the call with alarm. He was of opinion that a great city congregation was not his proper sphere of labour ; and he dreaded a severance from Cromarty.

From the first, dark forebodings possessed him. He wrote to Alexander Beith, who had sought to aid St George's in obtaining his 
consent to come, — " I feel as if destitute of the faculties for dealing with men. I ought to have been a monk in a cloister, 
dealing with books and systems; among living people I feel myself powerless as a child." To one of his own office-bearers he said, — "I see a dark lurid cloud hanging over me; but I can discover, I think, a bright spot beyond it."

To one of the Commissioners from the south who went to Cromarty to prosecute the Call, and who said to Mr. Stewart, on leaving the Presbytery meeting-place, "You look as if you were carrying a mountain on your back," he replied — " No, I am not carrying a mountain, but I am carrying my gravestone on my back."

Yet he had resolved to accept the call, saying to friends who were discouraging him from facing a difficult position — "Will 
I not be more useful in Edinburgh, though I were to live there only three months, than if I remained in Cromarty three years 
indulging my own ease and feelings, while God forsook me because I forsook both Him and the call of duty."

Stewart died on Friday, 5 November 1847. He is reported to have had a fever; the stress of the recent call may have been an inflencial factor. He was buried between the doors of the Free Church in Cromarty.

Works
The  Tree of  Promise  (Edinburgh,  1864) 
Man's, Redemption,  the  Joy  of  Angels,  a  sermon on  1  Peter  i.  12  (Precious  Seed  Discourses) (Edinburgh,  1877)
The  Mosaic  Sacrifices (Edinburgh,  1883)

Family
Alexander Stewart was the son of Alexander Stewart, Church of Scotland minister (Canongate Edinburgh), who himself was a son of Alexander Stewart, Church of Scotland minister (Blair Athole). 
He died unmarried. A  maternal  aunt,  the  widow  of  a  minister,  became,  after  the  death  of  her  husband,  an  inmate,  put  in  charge  of  the  domestic  affairs  of  the  manse  of  Cromarty.

References

Citations

Sources

19th-century Ministers of the Free Church of Scotland
19th-century Ministers of the Church of Scotland